Albert Le Guillard (1887–1958) was a French composer and conductor. 

He was born in Paris on 16 October, 1887 and became a pupil at the Conservatoire there. His teachers included Émile Pessard, Maurice Emmanuel and Maurice Ravel. In 1914 he began a string quartet, but soon after enlisted to fight in World War I. The work was finished when he returned from the war.

His death was reported in the 19 February 1958 issue of Le Monde.

References

External links

BNF data
Musicsack

1887 births
1958 deaths
French male classical composers
20th-century French conductors (music)
Musicians from Paris
French classical composers